The 1991 Individual Latvian Championship was the 17th Latvian Individual Speedway Championship season. The final took place on 10 August 1991 in Riga, Latvia. The defending champion was Nikolay Kokin.

Final
10 August 1991
 Riga

Speedway in Latvia
1991 in Latvian sport
1991 in speedway